Brendan McCahey is an Irish singer-songwriter and recording artist with Universal Music. McCahey also previously worked in a vintage guitar store. In April 2014, he was crowned winner of series 3 of the talent competition The Voice of Ireland.
He was mentored by former Blizzards frontman Bressie. Brendan became the bookies' favourite to win top prize after receiving a score of 28 out of 30 from coaches Kian Egan, Dolores O'Riordan and Jamelia. Following his victory, he released his debut single "You Can't Judge a Book by the Cover", originally sung by Bo Diddley. McCahey released his debut album To Where I Begin on 14 November 2014 and is currently touring.
He currently resides in Shercock county Cavan near lough Sillan lake. He is married with children

Performances on The Voice of Ireland

Discography

Singles

Albums, singles, EPs and other ventures 
Brendan has written and produced two albums prior to his appearance on The Voice of Ireland. He released his debut solo album To Where I Begin on 14 November 2014, following its lead single Sweet Love. He promoted the song by performing on The Late Late Show on 31 October 2014, its release date. The album's second single Safe and Well was released on 10 April 2015. The song was promoted with a performance on The Voice of Ireland on 12 April 2015.

Brendan began work on his second studio album in early 2015, working with songwriters such as Don Mescall. Throughout 2015 he released numerous original songs to his SoundCloud account to coincide with his gigs in the UK & Ireland. However, a follow up album to To Where I Begin has not been officially released.

McCahey announced on 24 May 2016 via Instagram that a new EP titled Too Tight would be released towards the end of June. To coincide with this announcement, a demo of a song titled Guide You Through was released to his SoundCloud account. McCahey also announced that he would upload even more songs to iTunes that year. After much delay, the EP was released in June 2017.

McCahey is continuously gigging as a solo artist and, from time to time, as part of his country group, The Goodgollys. He also continues to upload cover versions of his favourite songs to his SoundCloud account, while still creating original music in the background.

It was announced in January 2018 that McCahey was in the running to represent Ireland in the 2018 European Song Contest, competing against past winners Pat Byrne and Keith Hanley.

References

External links
The Voice Profile

Living people
Irish  male singer-songwriters
1976 births
Musicians from County Cavan
The Voice (franchise) winners
21st-century Irish  male singers
Date of birth missing (living people)